Waisale Sovatabua, (born 26 June 1973) is a Fijian former professional rugby league footballer who played as a  or  in the 1990s and 2000s. He played at representative level for Fiji, and at club level for the Sheffield Eagles, Huddersfield Giants and the Wakefield Trinity Wildcats (Heritage № 1169) in the Super League. He hails from the highland province of Namosi [village of Navunikabi] on Viti Levu with maternal links to the village of Ketei, Totoya, Lau archipelago.

Playing career

International career
He was a Fijian international and played at the 1995 and 2000 Rugby League World Cups.

Challenge Cup Final appearances
Waisale Sovatabua played  in Sheffield Eagles' 17-8 victory over Wigan in the 1998 Challenge Cup Final during Super League III at Wembley Stadium, London on Saturday 2 May 1998.

References

External links
Statistics at rugbyleagueproject.org
2001 Super League Team-by-team guide

1973 births
Fijian rugby league players
Fiji national rugby league team players
Sheffield Eagles (1984) players
Huddersfield Giants players
Rugby league centres
Wakefield Trinity players
Living people
Rugby league wingers
Rugby league fullbacks
Fijian expatriate rugby league players
Expatriate rugby league players in England
Fijian expatriate sportspeople in England
I-Taukei Fijian people